Glenise-Ann Jones, known as Ann Jones (born 25 October 1949) is a former Australian diver. She competed at the 1972 Munich Olympics in the 3 metre springboard event where she finished 26th of 30 and in the 10 metre platform event where she finished 26th.

References 

1949 births
Living people
Australian female divers
Divers at the 1972 Summer Olympics
Olympic divers of Australia
20th-century Australian women
21st-century Australian women